Gu Tian was a cargo ship situated in Mawei, Fujian. Built in the 1970s, it was the largest concrete ship ever constructed in China. High running costs led to the ship being abandoned and stranded ashore.

Now derelict, the ship has been stranded for more than 40 years, but, being made of concrete, does not deteriorate. Work began in November 2012 to dismantle the ship.

References

Ships of China
Concrete ships
1973 ships